Carl Gans (7 September 1923 – 30 November 2009) was a German-born American zoologist and herpetologist.

Early life and education
Gans, who was Jewish, was born in Germany. While a teenager in 1939, he was able to escape Nazi Germany by fleeing to the United States, where he completed his education. He attended George Washington High School in New York City. In 1944 he earned a BS in Mechanical Engineering at New York University, and in 1950 an MS in Mechanical Engineering at Columbia University. In 1957 he received a PhD in Biology from Harvard University.

Career
From 1947 to 1955 Gans worked as an engineer. From 1957 to 1958 he was a Fellow in Biology at the University of Florida. From 1958 to 1971 he taught biology at the State University of New York, Buffalo. From then on he was Professor of Biology at the University of Michigan. He retired in 1988. In 1997 he moved to Austin (Texas) where he had an adjunct position at The University of Texas.
 Gans was editor of the Biology of the Reptilia a 23-volume work published from 1969 to 2009.

Taxa described by Gans
Working in the scientific field of herpetology, Gans described 22 new species of reptiles, and 4 new species of amphibians.

Taxa named in honor of Gans
Gans is commemorated in the scientific names of several reptiles: Amphisbaena carlgansi, Amphisbaena carli, Amphisbaena cegei, Cynisca gansi, Cyrtodactylus gansi, Dasypeltis gansi, Eutropis gansi, Lankascincus gansi, and Nessia gansi.

References

Further reading 

Adler, Kraig (2010). "Carl Gans (1923–2009) and the Integrative Biology of Reptiles". Herpetological Review 41 (2): 142–144.
Bauer, Aaron M. (2010). "Reminiscenses of Carl Gans". Herp. Rev. 41 (2): 147–148.
 Bell, Christopher J. (2010). "Carl Gans: The Austin Years 1997–2009". Herp. Rev. 41 (2): 148–150.
 Northcutt, R. Glenn (2010). "Carl Gans: The Ann Arbor Years". Herp. Rev. 41 (2): 147.
 Rosenberg, Herb (2010). "Carl Gans: The Buffalo Years of 1961–1967". Herp. Rev. 41 (2): 144–147.

https://carlgans.org/

External links 
 

1923 births
2009 deaths
Columbia School of Engineering and Applied Science alumni
Jewish emigrants from Nazi Germany to the United States
Harvard Graduate School of Arts and Sciences alumni
Herpetologists
New York University alumni
University at Buffalo faculty
University of Michigan faculty
20th-century American zoologists